New Babylon may refer to:

Neo-Babylonian Empire (626 BC–539 BC), a period of Mesopotamian history that is also known as the Chaldean Dynasty
New Babylon (Constant Nieuwenhuys), the anti-capitalist city designed in 1950 by artist-architect Constant Nieuwenhuys
New Babylon (Left Behind), a fictional city depicted in the 1995 Left Behind series of books
 centre in The Hague
The New Babylon, a 1929 film written and directed by Grigori Kozintsev and Leonid Trauberg
Whore of Babylon or "Babylon the great", a Christian allegorical figure of evil mentioned in the Book of Revelation in the Bible